Upplands-Bro Municipality (Upplands-Bro kommun) is a municipality in Stockholm County in east central Sweden. Its seat is located in the town of Kungsängen.

The municipality was formed in 1952 through the amalgamation of five rural municipalities in Uppsala County. In 1971 it was transferred to Stockholm County.

Geography 
Situated by Lake Mälaren it is distinguished by its nature. The overwhelming majority of the population are located to one of the three towns Kungsängen (pop. 7,500), Bro (6,200) and Brunna (4,000), and most of the remaining area is taken up by countryside, a substantial part of it being agricultural.

History 
As apparent from its coat of arms, Upplands-Bro takes pride in its pre-historic history, and boasts some of the oldest ancient remains in Sweden. From the Iron Age, about 4,000 burial places have been found, and the remains from the Viking Age include 20 runestones. The figure in the coat of arms comes from one of these remains, a 3 cm tall bronze figure found near Kungsängen.

Every one of the six parishes also hosts a medieval church, built between 1100 and 1400.

In the 15th century, the fortress Almarestäket was built in the municipality, just east to the present location of Kungsängen. It was the seat of the Swedish archbishop until the Archbishop Gustav Trolle besieged himself there in 1517, leading to the demolition of the fortress in 1519. The ruins can still be visited.

Since 1970, the main base of the combined cavalry/infantry regiment Life Guards is located in Upplands-Bro. The regiment trains conscript companies of mechanized infantry, Royal Guards and military police. It is also the home of the Swedish Armed Forces International Centre (Swedint).

Demography

Population development

Residents with a foreign background
On the 31st of December 2017 the number of people with a foreign background (persons born outside of Sweden or with two parents born outside of Sweden) was 9 646, or 34.93% of the population (27 614 on the 31st of December 2017). On the 31st of December 2002 the number of residents with a foreign background was (per the same definition) 5 002, or 23.64% of the population (21 162 on the 31st of December 2002). On 31 December 2017 there were 27 614 residents in Upplands-Bro, of which 7 088 people (25.67%) were born in a country other than Sweden. Divided by country in the table below - the Nordic countries as well as the 12 most common countries of birth outside of Sweden for Swedish residents have been included, with other countries of birth bundled together by continent by Statistics Sweden.

Public transportation 
The municipality is served by the Stockholm public transport system operated by SL. The municipal seat Kungsängen used to be the north-western terminus of the Stockholm commuter rail network, but in 2000 this line was extended to Bålsta in Uppsala County and a new station was built in Bro. A new depot for commuter trains has recently been built in the municipality. There is also a bus network.

References

External links 

Upplands-Bro Municipality – Official site

Municipalities of Stockholm County
Metropolitan Stockholm